Cognitive anthropologist Pascal Boyer argued that minimally counterintuitive concepts (MCI) i.e., concepts that violate a few ontological expectations of a category such as the category of an agent, are more memorable than intuitive and maximally counterintuitive (MXCI) concepts. A number of experimental psychology studies have found support for Boyer's hypothesis.  Upal labelled this as the minimal counterintuitiveness effect or the MCI-effect.

Boyer originally did not precisely specify the number of expectation-violations that would render an idea maximally counterintuitive.  Early empirical studies including those by Boyer himself and others did not study MXCI concepts.  Both these studies only used concepts violating a single expectation (which were labelled as MCI concepts).  Atran was the first to study memory for MXCI concepts and labeled concepts violating 2-expectations as maximally counterintuitive.  Studies by the I-75 Cognition and Culture Group  also labelled ideas violating two expectations as maximally counterintuitive.  Barrett argued that ideas violating 1 or 2 ontological expectations should be considered MCI and only ideas violating 3 or more expectations should be labelled MXCI.  Subsequent studies of the MCI effect have followed this revised labelling scheme.

Upal has divided the cognitive accounts that explain the MCI effect into two categories: the context-based model of minimal counterintuitiveness, and content-based view of minimal counterintuitiveness.  The context-based view emphasizes the role played by context in making an idea counterintuitive whereas the content-based view ignores the role of context.

See also 
 Uncanny valley

References

Memory
Cognitive science